The Last Round-Up is a 1947 American Western film directed by John English and starring Gene Autry and Champion.

Plot
A rancher tries to convince an Indian tribe to relocate so their land can be used to provide water for Kansas City.

Cast
 Gene Autry as Gene Autry 
 Champion as Champ, Gene's Horse
 Jean Heather as Carol Taylor 
 Ralph Morgan as Charlie Mason 
 Carol Thurston as Lydia Henry 
 Mark Daniels as Matt Mason 
 Robert Blake as Mike Henry (as Bobby Blake)
 Russ Vincent as Jeff Henry   
 The Texas Rangers as Singing Quartette

See also
 List of American films of 1947

References

Bibliography
Holly George-Warren. Public Cowboy No. 1: The Life and Times of Gene Autry. Oxford University Press, 2009.

External links

1947 films
1947 Western (genre) films
American Western (genre) films
Columbia Pictures films
Films directed by John English
1940s English-language films
1940s American films